This article contains lists of State Protected Monuments of India.

Table of monuments
The State Protected Monuments are designated by the Archaeological Survey of India (ASI). The state governments of India are authorised to maintain, protect and promote the State Protected Monuments.

See also
 Monuments of National Importance of India
 National Geological Monuments of India
 List of World Heritage Sites in India
 List of Water Heritage Sites in India
 List of rock-cut temples in India
 List of forts in India
 List of museums in India

References

External links

PIB

Lists of monuments and memorials in India
Archaeological Survey of India
Heritage registers in India